Mithrapuram is a small village in Pathanamthitta district, Kerala, south India, and is 4 kilometers away from Adoor.

Etymology
The name "Mithrapuram" means "land of friends" in the Malayalam language. Previously, the name was the home address of "Mylathadathil" family in Mithrapuram. Later this place was popularised as "Mithrapuram".

Location
Mithrapuram is a beautiful place near by Adoor. The MC Road State Highway 1 (Kerala) passes through this place. lFor public peoples only can access K.S.R.T.C buses because private buses have limited kilometers to pass through the MC Road.

Economy
Most of the people in this area engage in Rubber tree agriculture.

Transportation
The nearest railway station is Chengannur railway station  from Mithrapuram and the nearest airport is Trivandrum International Airport  from Mithrapuram.

Distances to major places 
 Sabarimala - 
 Valiyakoickal Temple - 
 Pandalam - 
 Parumala Palli - 
 Thiruvananthapuram - 
 Kochi -

Major attractions 
 Bishop's house(Amalagiri estate).

Charitable institution 
 Kasturba gandhi bhavan DE-ADDICTION centre.

Industries 
 Indus motors and workshop.

Schools
 Udayagiri S.N. Public school (CBSE)
 The Travancore International School(CBSE)

College
Mar Chrysostom College of Arts & Science

Notable people
The famous author Mithrapuram K. Alexander also from the Mylathadathil family and the writer Mrs. Rajamma John from Ponnumvila Puthen Veedu (Kunnel) family.

See also 
 Pandalam
 Kurampala
 Adoor
 Adoor Gopalakrishnan
 College of Engineering Adoor
 Pathanamthitta

References

External links 
 news
 Official website of Travancore school
Official website of Indus motors
 Mithrapuram.K.Alexander
 Indiragandhi by Mithrapuram alexander
 Alexander Mithrapuram
 Chrysostom College of Arts & Science

Villages in Pathanamthitta district